Playlist Your Way is the second compilation album by Jodeci. It was released on August 5, 2008, by Universal Records as part of the Playlist Your Way Hits CD series.

Track listing
 "Get On Up"                                  	4:05
 "Love U 4 Life"                              	4:55
 "Come & Talk to Me"                          	4:31
 "Stay"                                       	5:10
 "My Heart Belongs to U"                      	4:59
 "Feenin'"                                    	5:11
 "Forever My Lady"                            	5:12
 "Freek'n You"                                	6:36
 "What About Us"                              	4:33
 "Good Luv"                                   	4:49
 "Alone"                                      	4:43
 "I'm Still Waiting"                          	4:19
 "U & I"                                      	4:05
 "Cry for You"                                	5:01

References

2008 greatest hits albums
Jodeci albums